The list of shipwrecks in June 1887 includes ships sunk, foundered, grounded, or otherwise lost during June 1887.

2 June

4 June

5 June

7 June

8 June

9 June

11 June

12 June

13 June

14 June

15 June

16 June

20 June

21 June

22 June

23 June

26 June

27 June

28 June

Unknown date

References

1887-06
Maritime incidents in June 1887